Betty Dorothy Birch (12 September 1923 – 20 September 2016) was an English cricketer who played primarily as a right-handed batter. She appeared in eight Test matches for England between 1951 and 1958. She played domestic cricket for Middlesex.

References

External links
 
 

1923 births
2016 deaths
People from Fulham
England women Test cricketers
Middlesex women cricketers
People educated at Lady Margaret School